The Joyce brothers may refer to the following Irish pairs of brothers:
 James Joyce (1882–1941), modernist writer, and Stanislaus Joyce (1884–1955), scholar and memoirist of his brother
 Patrick Weston Joyce (1827–1914) and Robert Dwyer Joyce  (1830–1883), both writers on history, folklore, and folk music

See also
 Joyce Brothers (1927–2013), American psychologist and television personality